The Genetics Society is a British learned society. It was founded by William Bateson and Edith Rebecca Saunders in 1919 and celebrated its centenary year in 2019.  It is therefore one of the oldest learned societies devoted to genetics. Its membership of over 2000 consists of most of the UK's active professional geneticists, including researchers, teachers and students. Industry and publishing are also represented in the membership.

The Genetics Society is a registered charity that organises scientific meetings to promote current research in genetics and genomics, and publishes primary research in genetics in the journals Heredity and Genes and Development.  It supports students to attend meetings, sponsors research through fieldwork grants and student bursaries, and promotes the public understanding of genetics.

Presidents of The Genetics Society

Society publications
The society publishes the journal Heredity in association with Nature Publishing Group and the journal Genes & Development in association with Cold Spring Harbor Laboratory Press. It also publishes The Genetics Society Newsletter and the Naked Genetics and  Genetics Unzipped (the latter hosted by Kat Arney) podcasts.

Medals and prizes

Mendel Medal
The Mendel Medal is named after Gregor Mendel (1822–84), famous for his experiments on heredity in peas and founder of genetics as a scientific discipline. The Mendel Medal is awarded by the President of the Genetics Society, usually twice within the President's term of office, to an individual who has made outstanding contributions to research in any field of genetics.

Sir Kenneth Mather Memorial Prize
The Sir Kenneth Mather Memorial Prize is awarded jointly by The Genetics Society and The University of Birmingham and rewards a student of any UK University or Research Institution who has shown outstanding performance in the area of quantitative or population genetics.

Balfour Lecture
The Balfour Lecture, named after the Genetics Society's first president, is an award to mark the contributions to genetics of an outstanding young investigator. The Balfour Lecturer is elected by the Society's Committee on the basis of nominations made by any individual member of the Society. The only conditions are that the recipient of the award must normally have less than 10 years’ postdoctoral research experience at the time of nomination, and that any nomination must be made with the consent of the nominee. Those making nominations must be members of the Genetics Society, but there is no requirement for the nominee to be a member, nor is there any restriction on nationality or residence.

Mary Lyon Medal
This new award, named after the distinguished geneticist Mary F. Lyon FRS, was established in 2015 to reward outstanding research in genetics to scientists who are in the middle of their research career.

Genetics Society Medal
The Genetics Society Medal  is an award that recognizes outstanding research contributions to genetics. The Medal recipient, who should still be active in research at the time the Medal is awarded, will be elected annually by the Genetics Society Committee on the basis of nominations made by any individual member of the Society. Those making nominations must be members of the Genetics Society, but there is no requirement for the nominee to be a member, nor any restriction on nationality or residence. Neither current members of the Committee nor those who have retired from office in the past four years may be nominated for the award. The recipient is invited to deliver a lecture at a Genetics Society meeting, where the medal will be awarded, in the year following their election.

JBS Haldane Lecture
The JBS Haldane Lecture, named in honour of the pioneering geneticist and evolutionary biologist J. B. S. Haldane, recognises an individual for outstanding ability to communicate topical subjects in genetics research, widely interpreted, to an interested lay audience. Awards are made annually and are presented at an open lecture given by the awardee.

Bruce Cattanach Prize
The Bruce Cattanach Prize is a 2022 addition to the Society award portfolio and is awarded annually for an outstanding PhD thesis related to the use of non-human in vivo animal models.

References

British biology societies
Genetics in the United Kingdom
Genetics societies
Learned societies of the United Kingdom
Organisations based in the London Borough of Camden
Scientific organizations established in 1919
1919 establishments in the United Kingdom
Scientific organisations based in the United Kingdom